The Mindanao bleeding-heart (Gallicolumba crinigera), also known as Bartlett's bleeding heart dove, Barlett's bleeding heart pigeon and the hair-breasted bleeding heart, is a species of bird in the pigeon family. It is endemic to the Philippines on the islands of Mindanao, Basilan, Samar, Leyte and Bohol. It is so named because of a red blotch on its breast. The generic name derives from a fusion of the Latin gallus ("chicken") and columba ("pigeon").

Description and taxonomy
The Mindanao bleeding-heart is about 29 cm in length and weighs 184–204 g. The forehead, crown, nape and mantle are metallic green, slightly duller on the forehead and sides of the head. The back to rump is a chocolate brown with fringes of green. The upper and central tail coverts are purplish brown, the chin and throat are white. Most striking is a blood red patch on the breast, hence the common name. The lower breast to the undertail is a rusty orange that is its darkest on the breast and flanks and palest on the belly. The underwing is chestnut brown and blackish on the edges. The wing shield is a dull brown with broad tips which make three distinct wing bars. The sexes are similar in appearance though there may be some dimorphism in iris colouration. Juveniles are dark chestnut or reddish brown with some metallic fringes on the mantle and scapular.

Subspecies 
Three subspecies are recognized:

 Gallicolumba crinigera cringera- Found on Mindanao, Basilan and Dinagat Islands; white throat and upper breast, light brown on the lower breast
 Gallicolumba crinigera bartletti- Found on Basilan; Similar to nominate but smaller with a fine bill 
 Gallicolumba crinigera leytensis -: Found on Samar, Leyte and Bohol; upper and lower breast dark green;

Behaviour
It is a shy bird which typically runs from danger, spending most of its time on the forest floor, and only flying short distances if flushed. It only perches in trees if frightened or when nesting or roosting. The call is a repeated woo-oo similar to that of most doves and pigeons. It is a rare sight because of its cryptic behaviour.

Breeding
Courtship is characterized by slowly raising and lowering the wings at regular intervals of a few seconds. The female lays a single creamy white egg, which it will incubate for 15–18 days (depending on the weather) and the young are capable of flight within 15–16 days of hatching. The breeding period is thought to take place during the rainy season (March through June).

Feeding
The birds feed on the forest floor, foraging for berries, seeds, worms and insects. In captivity they are typically fed grains, greens and parakeet seed.

Distribution and habitat
The Mindanao bleeding-heart exists (or used to exist) on the Philippine Islands of Samar, Leyte, Basilan, Mindanao, Bohol, and Dinagat. It is one of the three bleeding-heart doves that are native to their own particular island or islands of the Philippines. It naturally occurs in both primary and secondary tropical lowland rainforests up to an elevation of 750 m.

Conservation status
The main threats to the Mindanao bleeding-heart are deforestation and overhunting for food and for the pet trade. The status of the species is not sufficiently known for a definite assessment. Initially listed as being of least concern in 1988, it was subsequently uplisted to vulnerable in 1994, and further to endangered in 2000. With its exact rate of decline still unresolved, it was downlisted to vulnerable in the 2007 IUCN Red List with the population estimated at 1,000 to 2,499 mature individuals remaining.

This species' main threat is habitat loss with wholesale clearance of forest habitats as a result of logging, agricultural conversion and mining activities occurring within the range.  Forest cover was estimated at just 29% on Mindanao, and as little as 433 km2 of old-growth dipterocarp forest remained on Samar and Leyte. These figures are continuing to decline thanks to continued deforestation.

Conservation actions proposed include to  survey in remaining tracts of suitable habitat and areas with historical records, particularly on Samar and Leyte. Continue to advocate the effective protection of  key sites and potential habitat. Propose remaining forests found to support the species for establishment as protected areas. Promote more effective enforcement of laws relating to hunting and     trapping.

References

External links

ISIS (2008): Gallicolumba criniger bartletti held at ISIS-registered institutions. Retrieved 2008-10-23.
Arkive
BirdLife International
Memphis Zoo Society Docents
International Dove Society site

Mindanao bleeding-heart
Birds of Mindanao
Vulnerable fauna of Asia
Mindanao bleeding-heart
Taxonomy articles created by Polbot
Taxa named by Ludwig Reichenbach